The Bon Homme Gravel is a geologic formation in South Dakota. It preserves fossils.

See also

 List of fossiliferous stratigraphic units in South Dakota
 Paleontology in South Dakota

References
 

Geologic formations of South Dakota